The white-bellied free-tailed bat (Mops niveiventer) is a species of bat in the family Molossidae. It is found in Angola, the Democratic Republic of the Congo, and Zambia. Its natural habitats are subtropical or tropical moist lowland forests and moist savanna.

References

Mops (bat)
Taxonomy articles created by Polbot
Mammals described in 1926
Bats of Africa
Taxa named by Ángel Cabrera